Owen James Windsor (born 17 September 2001) is an English professional footballer who plays as a striker for Chippenham Town.

He has played in the Football League for Grimsby Town, Newport County and Carlisle United whilst on loan from West Bromwich Albion. He has also appeared at Non-league level for Cirencester Town and Taunton Town.

Career

Early career
After playing youth football for Swindon Town and Southampton, Windsor began his senior career with Cirencester Town.

West Bromwich Albion
After signing for West Bromwich Albion in June 2019, he spent loan spells back at Cirencester, and also with Taunton Town. In October 2020 he moved on loan to Grimsby Town.

Windsor scored twice in thirteen games for Grimsby including a goal in a 3–1 victory over Cheltenham Town, but after falling out of favour with manager Ian Holloway, his season-long loan was cut short on 19 December 2020, shortly before The Mariners 1–0 win over rivals Scunthorpe United.

On 5 January 2021, Windsor signed for Newport County on loan until the end of the 2020–21 season. He made his debut for Newport as a second half substitute in the 1-1 League Two draw against Cheltenham Town on 19 January 2021. However, on 1 February 2021 Windsor's loan at Newport was cancelled.

On 31 January 2022, Windsor joined League Two club Carlisle United on loan until the end of the 2021–22 season.

Windsor was not retained by West Bromwich Albion at the end of the 2021–22 season.

Chippenham Town
Windsor signed for Chippenham Town on 3 February 2023.

Personal life
Windsor attended Hartpury College.

References

2001 births
Living people
English footballers
Association football forwards
Swindon Town F.C. players
Southampton F.C. players
Cirencester Town F.C. players
West Bromwich Albion F.C. players
Taunton Town F.C. players
Grimsby Town F.C. players
Newport County A.F.C. players
Carlisle United F.C. players
Chippenham Town F.C. players
Southern Football League players
English Football League players